Vann Johnson (November 13, 1960 – September 27, 2017) was an American singer who toured or recorded with artists such as Michael Bolton, Neil Young, The Temptations, and Yanni.  She appeared as a featured vocalist in Yanni's live concert album and video, Tribute, in which she sang his first-ever song with completely English lyrics, "Love Is All".  She was a featured member of the house band, The Groove, for the television show The Singing Bee.

Vann Johnson died on September 27, 2017 at age 56, due to cancer.

Discography
 Messages (1999)

References

External links
 on Archive.org; original website down

Profile at Reflections an Unofficial Yanni fan page

1960 births
2017 deaths
21st-century American women
American women singers